Haddon Township is a township in Camden County, in the U.S. state of New Jersey. As of the 2020 United States census, the township's population was 15,407, an increase of 700 (+4.8%) from the 2010 census count of 14,707, which in turn reflected an increase of 56 (+0.4%) from the 14,651 counted in the 2000 census.

Under the terms of an act of the New Jersey Legislature on February 23, 1865, Haddon Township was incorporated from portions of Newton Township. The following communities were subsequently created from the Haddon Township: Haddonfield (April 6, 1875), Collingswood (May 22, 1888), Woodlynne (March 19, 1901), Haddon Heights (March 2, 1904), Audubon (March 13, 1905) and Oaklyn (also March 13, 1905). The township was named for early settler Elizabeth Haddon.

Haddon Township allows the sale of alcohol, and has several bars and restaurants which serve alcoholic beverages, unlike the neighboring boroughs of Collingswood, Haddonfield and Haddon Heights which prohibit the sale of alcohol.

History 
The township's first European settlers settled in the area of Newton Creek in 1681. In 1701, Elizabeth Haddon Estaugh, the daughter of John Haddon, arrived in the American colonies to oversee his large landholdings, which included areas that are now Collingswood, Haddon Township, and Haddonfield. Contemporary Newton Township included land that later became part of Audubon, Audubon Park, Camden, Collingswood, Gloucester City, Haddon Heights, Haddonfield, Oaklyn, and Woodlynne.

Saddlertown 
In the late 1830s, a runaway slave, who had taken the surname Saddler to avoid detection by his former master, came to New Jersey from a Maryland plantation with his wife and two daughters. Saddler worked for Cy Evans, a local Quaker farmer, from whom he bought five acres to farm.  The area where Saddler settled became a predominantly black community known as Saddlertown, a stop on the Underground Railroad. Today, Saddlertown is racially diverse.

Geography
According to the United States Census Bureau, Haddon township had a total area of 2.82 square miles (7.30 km2), including 2.69 square miles (6.97 km2) of land and 0.13 square miles (0.33 km2) of water (4.54%).

Haddon Township has two exclaves, West Collingswood Heights and West Collingswood Extension. The downtown portion of the township is known as Westmont, a name probably derived from a noted harness racing horse. Other unincorporated communities, localities and place names located partially or completely within the township include Crystal Lake, Cuthbert and Oakdale.

Haddon Township borders the Camden County municipalities of Audubon, Audubon Park, Camden, Cherry Hill (water border), Collingswood, Gloucester City, Haddonfield, Mount Ephraim, and Oaklyn.

Demographics

2010 census

The Census Bureau's 2006–2010 American Community Survey showed that (in 2010 inflation-adjusted dollars) median household income was $70,392 (with a margin of error of +/− $6,948) and the median family income was $90,156 (+/− $6,251). Males had a median income of $60,221 (+/− $5,315) versus $52,179 (+/− $4,167) for females. The per capita income for the borough was $35,506 (+/− $2,687). About 3.6% of families and 6.2% of the population were below the poverty line, including 2.4% of those under age 18 and 9.9% of those age 65 or over.

2000 census
As of the 2000 United States Census, there were 14,651 people, 6,207 households, and 3,891 families residing in the township. The racial makeup of the township was 95.42% White, 1.18% African American, 0.05% Native American, 2.01% Asian, 0.04% Pacific Islander, 0.56% from other races, and 0.74% from two or more races. Hispanic or Latino of any race were 1.54% of the population.

There were 6,207 households, out of which 27.5% had children under the age of 18 living with them, 49.9% were married couples living together, 9.9% had a female householder with no husband present, and 37.3% were non-families. 33.0% of all households were made up of individuals, and 17.5% had someone living alone who was 65 years of age or older. The average household size was 2.36 and the average family size was 3.05.

In the township, the population was spread out, with 22.6% under the age of 18, 5.8% from 18 to 24, 28.7% from 25 to 44, 22.9% from 45 to 64, and 20.0% who were 65 years of age or older. The median age was 41 years. For every 100 females, there were 88.4 males.  For every 100 females age 18 and over, there were 83.4 males.

The median income for a household in the township was $51,076, and the median income for a family was $65,269. Males had a median income of $44,943 versus $32,967 for females. The per capita income for the township was $25,610. About 1.6% of families and 4.1% of the population were below the poverty line, including 2.3% of those under age 18 and 5.2% of those age 65 or over.

Government

Local government
Since 1950, Haddon Township has been governed under the Walsh Act with a governing body comprised of a three-member commission. The Township is one of 30 municipalities (of the 564) statewide governed under the commission form of government. Commission members are elected at-large on a non-partisan basis as part of the May municipal election to serve four-year concurrent terms of office. At a reorganization meeting held after the election, each commissioner is assigned responsibility for supervising a specific department. The commissioners select one of their members to serve as a part-time mayor, who presides over meetings but has no independent executive function. Haddon Township has had only three mayors in its history: William Rohrer, William J. Park. Jr., (1997 New Jersey State League of Municipalities Mayors Hall of Fame), and Randall Teague.

, members of the Haddon Township Commission are 
Mayor Randall W. "Randy" Teague (Commissioner of Public Works, Parks and Public Property), 
Ryan Linhart (Commissioner of Revenue and Finance) and 
Jim Mulroy (Commissioner of Public Affairs and Public Safety; all serving terms of office that end May 16, 2023. Linhart, Mulroy and Teague ran unopposed in the May 2019 municipal election, the third consecutive time that township candidates won election without facing any challengers.

In November 2018, Ryan Linhart was appointed to fill the seat vacated by Paul Dougherty, who resigned the previous month before he pleaded guilty to a criminal charge.

Jim Mulroy was sworn into office in February 2017 to fill the seat vacated by John Foley, who resigned from office earlier that month.

Police, fire, and emergency services
Haddon Township has three fire districts (a fourth, District 2, was dissolved in 2016), each governed by five elected fire commissioners. Fire District 1 is the Westmont and Bluebird section, protected by the Westmont Fire Company No. 1, which was established in 1902. The former Fire District 2 covered the West Collingswood Extension section. Since being dissolved, Haddon Township now contracts directly with the Borough of Collingswood Fire Department (Station 16-1) for fire protection in the Extension section. Fire District 3 is the Bettlewood, Heather Glen, Heather House and Heather Woods sections and it contracts with the Westmont Fire Company No. 1 for fire protection from District 1.  Fire District 4 is the West Collingswood Heights section, protected by the West Collingswood Heights Fire Co.  Westmont Fire Co. (Station 15-1) and West Collingswood Heights Fire Co. (Station 15-2) are both Haddon Township companies, but separate entities with their own chiefs.

Ambulance service throughout the Township is also divided, mirroring the fire service.

The Westmont Fire Company No. 1 provides both fire and EMS services.  John D. Medes has served as Chief since 2007.

Police coverage throughout the entire township is provided by the Haddon Township Police Department, which also provides services for Audubon Park. The department was established in 1926. As of 2017, it consists of 26 sworn officers.

Federal, state and county representation 
Haddon Township is located in the 1st Congressional District and is part of New Jersey's 6th state legislative district.

 

Haddon Township does not have a dedicated postal zip code, sharing the zip codes of Collingswood, Haddonfield, Audubon, Audubon Park, and Oaklyn.

Politics
As of March 2011, there were a total of 10,876 registered voters in Haddon Township, of which 4,408 (40.5%) were registered as Democrats, 2,036 (18.7%) were registered as Republicans and 4,415 (40.6%) were registered as Unaffiliated. There were 17 voters registered as Libertarians or Greens.

In the 2012 presidential election, Democrat Barack Obama received 60.5% of the vote (4,975 cast), ahead of Republican Mitt Romney with 37.8% (3,104 votes), and other candidates with 1.7% (143 votes), among the 8,272 ballots cast by the township's 11,643 registered voters (50 ballots were spoiled), for a turnout of 71.0%. In the 2008 presidential election, Democrat Barack Obama received 59.7% of the vote (5,185 cast), ahead of Republican John McCain, who received around 37.4% (3,244 votes), with 8,685 ballots cast among the township's 10,887 registered voters, for a turnout of 79.8%. In the 2004 presidential election, Democrat John Kerry received 58.7% of the vote (5,021 ballots cast), outpolling Republican George W. Bush, who received around 39.8% (3,401 votes), with 8,549 ballots cast among the township's 10,762 registered voters, for a turnout percentage of 79.4.

In the 2013 gubernatorial election, Republican Chris Christie received 58.3% of the vote (2,834 cast), ahead of Democrat Barbara Buono with 39.9% (1,941 votes), and other candidates with 1.8% (90 votes), among the 4,978 ballots cast by the township's 11,501 registered voters (113 ballots were spoiled), for a turnout of 43.3%. In the 2009 gubernatorial election, Democrat Jon Corzine received 49.2% of the vote (2,705 ballots cast), ahead of both Republican Chris Christie with 43.0% (2,365 votes) and Independent Chris Daggett with 5.9% (327 votes), with 5,498 ballots cast among the township's 10,864 registered voters, yielding a 50.6% turnout.

Education
The Haddon Township School District serves public school students in pre-kindergarten through twelfth grade. As of the 2018–19 school year, the district, comprised of seven schools, had an enrollment of 2,060 students and 165.9 classroom teachers (on an FTE basis), for a student–teacher ratio of 12.4:1. Schools in the district (with 2018–19 enrollment data from the National Center for Education Statistics) are 
Thomas A. Edison Elementary School (152 students; in grades Pre-K–5), 
Clyde S. Jennings Elementary School (113; K–5), 
Stoy Elementary School (168; Pre-K–5), 
Strawbridge Elementary School (196; K–5), 
Van Sciver Elementary School (319; Pre-K–5), 
William G. Rohrer Middle School (465; 6–8) and 
Haddon Township High School (622; 9–12).

Prior to the establishment of Haddon Township High School in the 1960s, most Haddon Township students attended Collingswood High School, while some attended Haddonfield Memorial High School or Audubon High School.

Paul VI High School is a regional high school founded in September 1966 that operates under the oversight of the Roman Catholic Diocese of Camden with an enrollment of over 1,000 students. Holy Saviour School was an elementary school that operated under the auspices of the Camden diocese until it closed in 2008.

Library
Haddon Township is part of the Camden County Library System; the Haddon Township Branch library is located on MacArthur Boulevard.

Transportation

Public transportation
Westmont station, in the downtown section of Haddon Township, is a PATCO Park-and-Ride station.

NJ Transit provides bus service between the township and Philadelphia on the 403 route, with local service available on the 450 and 451 routes.

Roads and highways

U.S. Route 30 and County Route 561 are the main highways serving the eastern portion of Haddon Township. U.S. Route 130 and New Jersey Route 168 are the main highways serving the western segment. The eastern terminus of New Jersey Route 76C is also within the western segment of Haddon Township.

Points of interest

 Westmont Theatre
 Newton Union Schoolhouse (also called The Champion School), a one-room school house built in 1821
 Ritz Theatre is an active live producing theatre company, built in a Colonial Revival style in 1927 as a vaudeville theatre. In 2002, the Ritz was added to the New Jersey and National Register of Historic Places.
 Saddler's Woods protects  of old-growth forest just  from Philadelphia.

Notable people

People who were born in, residents of, or otherwise closely associated with Haddon Township include:

 Mitch Albom (born 1958), writer
 Laurie Beechman (1953–1998), Broadway actress
 Tony Black (born 1951), record-holding jockey in North American Thoroughbred horse racing
 William B. Brahms (born 1966), librarian and encyclopedist
 George E. Brunner (1896–1975), mayor of Camden, New Jersey from 1936 to 1959
 William K. Dickey (1920–2008), lawyer and politician who served as Speaker of the New Jersey General Assembly and as chairman of the Delaware River Port Authority
 Mark Donohue (1937–1975), race car driver
 Joe Flacco (born 1985), NFL Quarterback
 Larry Kane (born 1942), only American reporter to travel with The Beatles on their 1964 North American tour
 John McCarthy (1916–1998), football player and coach
 Don McComb (1934–2018), defensive end who played for the Boston Patriots
 Samuel Vaughan Merrick (1801–1870), first President of the Pennsylvania Railroad and co-founder of the Franklin Institute
 Cozy Morley (born 1926), entertainer, singer
 Sal Paolantonio (born 1956), ESPN reporter and writer
 Mary Roebling (1905–1994), banker, businesswoman, and philanthropist who was the first woman to serve as president of a major U.S. bank
 William G. Rohrer (1909–1989), founder of First Peoples Bank of New Jersey, the first bank in South Jersey to reach $1 billion in deposits, and mayor of Haddon Township for 36 years
 Peter Schwartz (born 1946), futurist, innovator, author, and co-founder of the Global Business Network
 Hannah Whitall Smith (1832–1911), author in the Holiness movement and suffragette
 Steven Spielberg (born 1946), motion picture director and producer
 John M. Whitall (1800–1877), glass manufacturer and philanthropist
 Julianna White (born 1988), Miss New Jersey USA 2011

References

External links

Saddler's Woods Conservation Association
Haddon Township Historical Society

 
1865 establishments in New Jersey
Populated places established in 1865
Populated places on the Underground Railroad
Townships in Camden County, New Jersey
Walsh Act
Discontiguous municipalities in New Jersey